Barwell Football Club is a football club based in Barwell, near Hinckley in Leicestershire, England.

History
The club was established in 1992 as a merger of Hinckley of the Midland Combination Premier Division and Barwell Athletic of the Leicestershire Senior League Premier Division; the new club took Hinckley's place in the Midland Combination.

In 1994 Barwell were founder members of the Midland Alliance. They won the Leicestershire and Rutland Senior Cup in 1996–97 and the League Cup in 2005–06, beating Leamington 3–1 in the final. After finishing as runners-up in 2008–09, they won the league the following season, earning promotion to Division One South of the Northern Premier League. Their first season in the division saw them win the title, earning promotion to step three of the National League System. Instead of playing in the Northern Premier League's Premier Division, the club were moved to the Premier Division of the Southern League. However, two seasons later, they were transferred back to the Northern Premier League.

In 2015–16 Barwell reached the first round of the FA Cup for the first time, losing 2–0 at home to Welling United. The following season saw them win the Leicestershire and Rutland Challenge Cup, beating Coalville Town 3–1 in the final. The club was transferred to the Premier Central division of the Southern League at the end of the 2017–18 season as part of the restructuring of the non-League pyramid.

Ground
The club play at Kirkby Road in Barwell. The sports complex also incorporates bowling facilities and a cricket pitch, which was once used for first class matches. Floodlights were installed prior to the 1992–93 season, and a number of seats were obtained from the old main stand at Leicester City's Filbert Street ground. A new covered stand to accommodate five hundred spectators was built prior to the 1996–97 season. Towards the end of the 2000–01 season, a new 256 seater cantilever stand was erected, and the club have made further improvements to allow them to progress up the pyramid. The ground currently has a capacity of 2,500, of which 256 is seated and 750 covered.

Players

Current squad

The Southern Football League does not use a squad numbering system.

Former players
See Barwell F.C. players

International players
Players signed to, or have played for Barwell that have had full international caps during their careers.

|-
|valign="top"|

Antigua and Barbuda
 Luke Blakely
 Blaize Punter

Bermuda
 Roger Lee

|width="33"| 
|valign="top"|

Montserrat
 Wayne Dyer
 Massiah McDonald
 Spencer Weir-Daley

|width="33"| 
|valign="top"|

Northern Ireland
 Tony Capaldi

|width="33"| 
|valign="top"|

Saint Kitts and Nevis
 Romario Martin
 Ryan Robbins

Management and coaching staff

Boardroom

Current staff

Managerial history

Honours
Northern Premier League
Division One South champions 2010–11
Midland Alliance
Champions 2009–10
League Cup winners 2005–06
Leicestershire and Rutland Senior Cup
Winners 1996–97
Leicestershire and Rutland Challenge Cup
Winners 2016–17

Records
Highest league position: 7th in the Southern League Premier Division, 2012–13
Best FA Cup performance: First round, 2015–16
Best FA Trophy performance: Third qualifying round, 2014–15
Best FA Vase performance: Semi-finals, 2009–10
Most appearances: Liam Castle
Most goals: Kev Charley

See also
Barwell F.C. players
Barwell F.C. managers

References

External links
Official website

 
Football clubs in England
Football clubs in Leicestershire
Association football clubs established in 1992
1992 establishments in England
Hinckley and Bosworth
Midland Football Combination
Midland Football Alliance
Southern Football League clubs
Northern Premier League clubs